Louis Gantois (15 November 1929 – 26 February 2011) was a French sprint canoeist who competed in the early to mid-1950s. He won a bronze medal in the K-1 1000 m event at the 1952 Summer Olympics in Helsinki. Gantois also won two medals at the 1954 ICF Canoe Sprint World Championships in Mâcon with a silver in the K-1 1000 m and a bronze in the K-4 1000 m events.

References

Louis Gantois' profile at Sports Reference.com
Mention of Louis Gantois' death 
Louis Gantois' obituary 

1929 births
2011 deaths
Sportspeople from Saint-Maur-des-Fossés
Canoeists at the 1952 Summer Olympics
Canoeists at the 1956 Summer Olympics
French male canoeists
Olympic canoeists of France
Olympic bronze medalists for France
Olympic medalists in canoeing
ICF Canoe Sprint World Championships medalists in kayak
Medalists at the 1952 Summer Olympics